Lany Tounka (or Lani Tounka) is a small town and main settlement (chef-lieu) of the commune of Sony in the Cercle of Kayes in the Kayes Region of south-western Mali. The town lies on the south bank of the Senegal River 73 km northwest of Kayes.

References

Populated places in Kayes Region